This is a list of foreign players in the Nepal Super League. The following players:
Are considered foreign, i.e., outside Nepal:
''A player is considered foreign if he is not eligible to play for the national team of Nepal.
More specifically,
If a player has been capped on international level, the national team is used; if he has been capped by more than one country, the highest level (or the most recent) team is used. 
If a player has not been capped on international level, his country of birth is used.

Current foreign players

Past foreign players

  Bikash Meraglia

References

Nepal Super League
foreign Nepal Super League players